
Gmina Nowa Sarzyna is an urban-rural gmina (administrative district) in Leżajsk County, Subcarpathian Voivodeship, in south-eastern Poland.

Villages
Apart from the town of Nowa Sarzyna, Gmina Nowa Sarzyna contains the villages and settlements of Jelna, Jelna-Judaszówka, Łętownia, Łętownia-Gościniec, Łukowa, Majdan Łętowski, Ruda Łańcucka, Sarzyna, Tarnogóra, Wola Żarczycka and Wólka Łętowska.

Neighbouring gminas
Gmina Nowa Sarzyna is bordered by the town of Leżajsk and by the gminas of Jeżowe, Kamień, Krzeszów, Leżajsk, Rudnik nad Sanem and Sokołów Małopolski.

References

Polish official population figures 2006

Nowa Sarzyna
Leżajsk County